Gostala is a rural locality (a selo) in Kazbekovsky District, Republic of Dagestan, Russia. The population was 517 as of 2010. There are 5 streets.

Nationalities 
Avars live there.

Geography
Gostala is located 6 km east of Dylym (the district's administrative centre) by road Dylym is the nearest rural locality.

References 

Rural localities in Kazbekovsky District